Stormy Sea is an watercolor landscape painting by German painter Emil Nolde, executed in 1930. It has the dimensions of on 34 by 45 cm. The painting is held in the collection of the Sprengel Museum in Hanover, Germany.

Description
This piece has very organic lines and there are many spots of bright colors, in particular blues and oranges. There are two boats on the horizon and a steam boat off to the right side which is a nod to modernism and industrialization. The bright fiery orange on the horizon gives a sense of drama to the piece and the white color in the foreground shows the crests of the moving waves. The waves juxtaposed against the fiery horizon animate the painting, and the colors help to depict the tumultuous waves. The orange light in the sky imbues energy and excitement against the dark blue waters.

Nolde's technique
Nolde elevated watercolor far above the level of a specialized technique and achieved works of breathtaking and ephemeral beauty which stand unique in the history of twentieth-century art. His use of color conveys movement and emotion, and the mysterious quality of painting is typical of the Die Brücke style. Watercolor is a medium that Nolde liked because he could translate his ideas and concepts to creation faster than oil painting which requires that it is drawn out and planned before it is put on canvas.

Nolde said about his paintings, “To the annoyance of art historians I shall destroy all lists that give information about the dates of my pictures.” His wife, Ada Nolde, kept a precise catalog of his oil paintings but not of his watercolors.

Nolde's reception
His work was condemned in the III Reich as Degenerate Art. Nolde was heavily censored even though he was Nazi supporter. During this time many of his works were removed from German museums and he was heavily censored by the Nazi Party during the 1930s and 1940s.

Nolde’s landscapes are not mere pictures of mood or reflections of the changing atmosphere of a year or a day, but are meant to be truly ‘landscapes of the soul’, the free and direct expression of artistic and human experience. He expresses true feeling and emotion with the fluidity and bright colors present in his watercolors. Nolde was able to create work faster through watercolor. Watercolor was Nolde’s primary medium from the 1930s until his death.

References

External links
Selz, Peter(1963)."Emile Nolde". New York:Doubleday&CO.INC.
Jill Lloyd, "Nolde, Emil." Grove Art Online. Oxford Art Online. Oxford University Press, accessed March 24, 2014, http://www.oxfordartonline.com/subscriber/article/grove/art/T062679.
Urban, Martin(1970)."Emile Nolde Landscapes:Watercolors and Drawings".New York:Praeger Publishers, INC.

1930 paintings
Paintings by Emil Nolde
Maritime paintings
Watercolor paintings